Pope John VII of Alexandria, 77th Pope of Alexandria and Patriarch of the See of St. Mark.

With support from some of the bishops, Pope John VII was replaced for three years by Pope Gabriel III, who was originally one of the candidates for the post. He was restored as pope after the death of Gabriel III. This is the only occasion in history when the Coptic Orthodox Church had two popes at the same time.

References

13th-century Coptic Orthodox popes of Alexandria
1293 deaths